Park Seo-yeon (Korean: 박서연; born on 5 March 2002) is a South Korean actress. Formerly a child actress, she made her acting debut in 2011, since then, she has appeared in number of films and television series. She is known for her various roles as child actor. She was nominated for Best Young Actress Award in 2016 for the  KBS's TV series The Promise and On the Way to the Airport. She has acted in films also such as: 26 Years (2012) and Scarlet Innocence (2014). In 2022 she is cast in fantasy TV series Showtime Begins!.

Career
Park Seo Yeon was born on March 5, 2002. After graduating in acting from the Goyang Arts High School, she made her debut in the 2011 short film Working on Saturday.

Park Seo-yeon has played childhood role of Soo Ae's in A Thousand Days' Promise (2011),  Hwang Jung-eum's in Lucky Romance (2016) and Seo Ji-hye's in Crash Landing on You (2020), establishing herself as a child actress. She has appeared in films playing young role in 26 Years (2012), Happiness for Sale (2013), and Scarlet Innocence (2014).

In 2022 she is cast in MBC's fantasy TV series Showtime Begins! as ghost Kang Ah-reum alongside Park Hae-jin a ghost employer.

Filmography

Films

Television series

Awards and nominations

References

External links

 
 Park Seo-yeon on Daum 
 

Living people
2002 births
South Korean child actresses
Actresses from Seoul
21st-century South Korean actresses
South Korean film actresses
South Korean television actresses